Outcry (known as Outcry: The Dawn in Europe) is a first person psychological thriller point-and-click adventure video game developed by Phantomery Interactive, released for the PC by Noviy Disk May 22, 2008 in Russia, and by The Adventure Company September 3, 2008 in the US.

Story
You receive a letter from your brother, a scientist, who invites you to his home so that he can show you the results of his project, and you can get some ideas for your next book. However, once you arrive you find that your brother has mysteriously vanished, leaving all his material possessions to you - including a large, strange machine and a message telling you not to reproduce his experiments.

Disregarding your brothers warning, you start looking for clues that will help you find your missing brother. You discover that the machine he has created is an instrument for making a person disconnect the mind from the body. Recreating the experiment as best you can, you travel to a surreal, dream like place your brother calls The Shimmering World to save him.

Gameplay
The game is played through the eyes of the main character, in first person perspective with a 360 degree panoramic view and point and click interface. Controls are set up to be as easy to use as possible. Clicking the left mouse button will move the main character to the next area, pick up items, read books and notes, etc. On the other hand, right clicking will bring up a list of notes and books that you've already read, a list of items that you carry, and a button for showing the menu.

Throughout the game you will encounter several puzzles that must be solved by searching for clues in journals and other writings, listening to sounds, traveling back in time, or by pure logic.

Reception
The game has received very mixed reviews, from lowest grade to top marks. The average sits a bit above average, however, with 62/100 average from MobyGames, 61.77% from GameRankings, and 63/100 from Metacritic.

References

External links
 Official site
 Developer's site

2008 video games
Adventure games
Point-and-click adventure games
The Adventure Company games
Windows games
Windows-only games
Video games developed in Russia